Rédouane Hennouni-Bouzidi (born 16 January 1989) is a French Paralympic athlete who competes at international elite track and field competitions. He competes in middle-distance running and cross-country running events, he was a former steeplechase runner. He is a double European champion and has competed at the 2020 Summer Paralympics where he finished fourth in the men's 1500m T38.

Impairment
Hennouni-Bouzidi was practicing figure skating in a training session, he tried doing a Salchow jump and lost balance and struck his head on another skater's skate. He was hospitalised and underwent brain surgery to remove a blood clot which resulted in paralysis on his right side.

References

External links
 
 

1989 births
Living people
Sportspeople from Amiens
Paralympic athletes of France
French male middle-distance runners
French male steeplechase runners
French cross country runners
Athletes (track and field) at the 2020 Summer Paralympics
Medalists at the World Para Athletics European Championships
French sportspeople of Algerian descent